Miloš, Milos, Miłosz or spelling variations thereof is a masculine given name and a surname. It may refer to:

Given name

Sportsmen 
 Miłosz Bernatajtys, Polish rower
 Miloš Bogunović, Serbian footballer
 Miloš Budaković, Serbian footballer
 Miloš Ćuk, Serbian water polo player, Olympic champion
 Miloš Dimitrijević, Serbian footballer
 Miloš Holuša, Czech race walker
 Miloš Jojić, Serbian footballer
 Miloš Korolija, Serbian water polo player
 Miloš Krasić, Serbian footballer
 Miloš Marić, Serbian footballer
 Miloš Milošević, Croatian swimmer
 Miloš Milutinović, Serbian footballer and manager
 Miloš Nikić, Serbian volleyball player
 Miloš Ninković, Serbian footballer
 Miloš Pavlović (racing driver), Serbian racing driver
 Milos Raonic, Montenegrin-born Canadian tennis player
 Miloš Stanojević (rower), Serbian rower
 Miloš Šestić, Serbian footballer
 Miloš Teodosić, Serbian basketball player
 Miloš Terzić, Serbian volleyball player
 Miloš Tomić, Serbian rower
 Miloš Vasić, Serbian rower
 Miloš Vemić, Serbian volleyball player
 Miloš Vujanić, Serbian basketball player

Other 
 Milos Alcalay (born 1945), Venezuelan diplomat
 Miloš Vojinović (fl. 1330), Serbian nobleman
 Miloš Obilić (fl. 1389), possibly legendary Serbian knight
 Miloš Crnjanski, Serbian poet, author, diplomat
 Millosh Gjergj Nikolla, Albanian poet
 Miloš Forman, Czech film director, screenwriter, actor and professor
 Miloš Jakeš (1922–2020), Czechoslovak politician
 Miloš Karadaglić, Montenegrin classical guitarist
 Miloš Obrenović, Prince of Serbia
 Miloš Tichý, Czech astronomer
 Miloš Zahradník, Czech mathematician
 Miloš Zeman, current President of the Czech Republic
 Miłosz Magin, Polish composer and pianist
 Miłosz Biedrzycki, Polish poet, translator and geophysical engineer

Surname 
 Czesław Miłosz (1911–2004),  Polish poet and winner of the Nobel Prize in Literature 1980.
 Andrzej Miłosz (1917–2002), brother of Czesław and a journalist, translator, and documentary film producer
 Oscar Milosz (1877–1939), poet and diplomat who wrote in French and a cousin of Czesław Miłosz
 Stephen Milosz (born 1955), Australian cricket player
 Ljubo Miloš (1919–1948), Croatian World War II official and concentration camp commandant executed for war crimes
 Mato Miloš, Croatian footballer
 Nenad Miloš, Serbian swimmer
 Predrag Miloš, Serbian swimmer

References

Slavic masculine given names
Serbian masculine given names
Czech masculine given names
Polish masculine given names